The Jilin–Heihe Expressway, commonly referred to as the Jihei Expressway, is a planned expressway that will connect the cities of Jilin City, Jilin, China, and Heihe, Heilongjiang. Heihe is on the China–Russia border. However, there is no road bridge over the Amur River, which forms the border between the two countries, and a road connection is only available on the frozen river during the winter.

The expressway is a spur of G12 Hunchun–Ulanhot Expressway.

Detailed Itinerary

References

Chinese national-level expressways
Expressways in Jilin
Expressways in Heilongjiang